Jocy Fernandes Afonso Barros (born 7 August 1985 in São Tomé and Príncipe), simply known as Jó, is a Santomean footballer.

Career

Portugal

While studying at university in Portugal, Barros plied his trade for a plenitude of clubs there, including Carapinheirense, Oliviera do Hospital, Pedroguense, Figueiró dos Vinhos, and SC Pombal, moving to GD Pampilhosense in 2013. Racking 17 goals in his first 20 matches for Pampilhosense, Barros was beholden to the Pampilhosense Fans Group for their support. Upon signing for Pampilhosa, the attacker's objective was to be coach Fernando Niza's first choice in the upcoming season.  Over time, while playing in Portugal, he had gotten offers from abroad but declined them, saying that it would be malapropos for him to go overseas as it was too early. Supposing he finished his degree, he would prefer to go to France or England in order to learn their languages.

Upon signing for SC Pombal in 2012, the winger expressed indebtedness to the Pedroguense and Figueiró dos Vinhos supporters for their congeniality towards him when he played there.

Romania

Loaned out to Romanian lower-league team FC Universitatea Ordea until the end of the 2016 season, the Santomean made an impact on the league, notching 3 goals in his first 2 matches there.

Personal life
Luis Leal and Jairson Semedo are among Barros' local footballing idols.

References

1985 births
Living people
São Tomé and Príncipe footballers
São Tomé and Príncipe international footballers
Vitória FC Riboque players
FC Pampilhosa players
F.C. Oliveira do Hospital players
S.C. Pombal players
Lusitano G.C. players
Expatriate footballers in Portugal
Expatriate footballers in Romania
Association football forwards
Association football wingers
São Tomé and Príncipe expatriates in Portugal